The poppy seed roll is a pastry consisting of a roll of sweet yeast bread (a sweet roll) with a dense, rich, bittersweet filling of poppy seed. An alternative filling is a paste of minced walnuts, or minced chestnuts.

It is popular in Central Europe and parts of Eastern Europe, where it is commonly eaten at Christmas and Easter time.
It is traditional in several cuisines, including Polish (makowiec), 
Kashubian (makówc), Hungarian (mákos bejgli), Slovak (makovník), Czech (makový závin), Austrian (Mohnbeugel, Mohnstrudel or Mohnstriezel), Ukrainian (pyrih z makom пирiг з маком or makivnyk маківник), Belarusian (makavy rulet макавы рулет), Bosnian, Croatian and Serbian (makovnjača or štrudla sa makom), Slovenian (makova potica), Romanian (coarda cu mac or coarda cu nucă), Russian (rulet s makom рулет с маком), Lithuanian (aguonų vyniotinis), Latvian (magonmaizite), German (Mohnstrudel), Danish (wienerbrød, or Vienna bread), and Yiddish (mohn roll).

Ingredients
The dough is made of flour, sugar, egg yolk, milk or sour cream and butter, and yeast. The dough may be flavored with lemon or orange zest or rum. The poppy seed filling may contain ground poppy seeds, raisins, butter or milk, sugar or honey, rum and vanilla. Sometimes apricot jam, which is one of the most popular jams used in Hungarian cuisine, is substituted for sugar. The walnut roll filling contains raisins, rum, butter or milk, lemon rind and chopped walnuts. This filling may be spiced with cinnamon, nutmeg, clove or vanilla.

The dough is at first quite heavy, stiff and dry, but with kneading and resting becomes very elastic and strong. It is rolled out into a large sheet, thick or thin depending on taste. One aesthetic principle is that the dough and filling layers should be of equal thickness. Another is that more layers are better. The filling is spread over the dough, which is then rolled into a long cylinder or log. Traditional recipes usually involve brushing the log with the egg white left over from the yolk used in the dough. The unbaked log is gently transferred to a sheet pan, left to rise, then baked until golden brown. 

Other recipes use different washes before baking, or a glaze or icing added after.

Variants
The poppy seed filling is a paste of ground poppy seeds, milk, butter, sugar and/or honey, often with additional flavorings such as lemon zest and juice. It may have raisins. The walnut filling is a paste of ground walnuts, milk, butter, sugar, often with additional flavorings such as coffee or orange zest, and may also have raisins.

A very long roll may be bent so that it fits on a baking sheet; the result is called a patkó in Hungarian. Before baking, the roll may be given a wash of milk. The roll can be finished with a glaze or icing, made of powdered sugar and lemon juice. It is typically presented sliced.

In Hungarian cuisine, the rolls, one with each filling, are served together. The combination is known as mákos és diós (poppy seed and walnut). However, in some English language cookbooks there may be no mention of the walnut filling as an alternative. Some other food writers combine the poppy seeds and walnuts together in one filling.
Due to intermingling of Polish and Czech culture, immigrants to America sometimes use the term "Kolache" to describe it.

As a new trend, a chestnut-filled variant (gesztenyés bejgli) is emerging, mainly among younger urban families.

A similar Armenian pastry is nazook (also spelled nazuk or nazouk, Armenian Նազուկ, Persian نازوک), made from flour, butter, sugar, sour cream, yeast, vanilla extract and eggs, with a filling often of chopped nuts, and especially walnuts. Nazook is sometimes referred to as gata.

Nokul or lokum is a type of puff pastry made in Turkey and Bulgaria, with variations. It consists of a rolled sheet of yeast dough onto which feta-style white cheese, walnut or poppy seed is sprinkled over a thin coat of butter. The dough is then rolled, cut into individual portions, and baked. Nokul is sometimes served hot as an appetizer instead of bread.

See also

 Mohnstrudel (poppy seed strudel)
 Nut roll
 Cozonac
 Hamantash
 Kolacz
 List of desserts
 Lokum
 Tsoureki

References

External links

Recipe: Hungarian Beigli
Recipe: Croatian makovnjača

Christmas food
Easter food
Hungarian desserts
Lithuanian desserts
Pastries with poppy seeds
Polish desserts
Czech cuisine
Silesian cuisine
Slavic cuisine